The Fabulous Chi-Ali is the only studio album by American rapper and the Native Tongues member Chi-Ali. It was released on March 24, 1992, via Relativity Records. Recording sessions took place at Calliope Studios in New York City. Production was handled by The Beatnuts, except for one song produced by Black Sheep's Mista Lawnge. It features guest appearances from Trugoy the Dove of De La Soul, Dres of Black Sheep, Fashion of the Beatnuts and Phife Dawg of A Tribe Called Quest.

The album peaked at #189 on the Billboard 200 and #8 on the Heatseekers Albums in the United States. It spawned three singles: "Age Ain't Nothin' but a #", "Roadrunner" and "Let the Horns Blow"/"Funky Lemonade", which made it to #6, #9 and #19 on the Hot Rap Singles chart.

Track listing

Chart history

References

External links

1992 debut albums
Relativity Records albums
Albums produced by the Beatnuts